RAF Dounreay was built for RAF Coastal Command in 1944, but not used by them. It was transferred to the Royal Navy as HMS Tern II, but not commissioned and on care and maintenance until 1954.

In 1955 the airfield was taken over by the United Kingdom Atomic Energy Authority (UKAEA) for developing a fast breeder reactor. One runway was kept operational until the 1990s for transport to/from the site.

See also 
Dounreay

References

Caithness
Defunct airports in Scotland
Airports established in 1944